KDHK (100.5 FM) is a mainstream rock radio station in Decorah, Iowa. KDHK is also the home for the Iowa Hawkeyes, broadcasting Iowa Hawkeyes football and basketball. Weekend programming includes Dee Snider's House of Hair, LA Lloyd's Rock 30 and Sammy Hagar's Top Rock Countdown.

History
The station's original call letters were KRDI-FM, assigned in 1986. On May 1, 2009, KDEC-FM began streaming online at kdecradio.net.

On October 1, 2019, KDEC-FM changed their format from adult album alternative to mainstream rock, branded as "Hawk Rawk" under new KDHK calls and began streaming online at hawkrawk.com.

On May 8, 2021, KDHK starting broadcasting in HD Radio

HD Radio sub-channels

References

External links

DHK
Radio stations established in 1986
1986 establishments in Iowa